Azteca América was an American Spanish language broadcast television television network owned by INNOVATE Corp., which launched on July 28, 2001, with the name and branding licensed from Azteca International Corporation. As of September 2019, the network had affiliation agreements with 75 television stations. Azteca also provided a national cable network feed that was distributed directly to cable, satellite and IPTV providers in various media markets not listed in this article, as an alternative method of distribution in areas without either the availability or the demand for a locally based owned-and-operated or affiliate station.

On December 31, 2022, Azteca América ceased all operations.

This article is a listing of current Azteca affiliates in the continental United States and U.S. possessions (including subchannel affiliates, satellite stations and select low-power translators), arranged alphabetically by state, and based on the station's city of license and followed in parentheses by the Designated Market Area if it differs from the city of license. There are links to and articles on each of the broadcast stations, describing their histories, technical information (such as broadcast frequencies) and any local programming. The station's virtual (PSIP) channel number follows the call letters. Stations listed with a two-letter "N/A" suffix in the physical digital channel column following a station's call letters indicates an analog low-power station that does not operate a companion digital signal.

The article also includes a list of its former affiliate stations, which is also based on the station's city of license or market, and denotes the years in which the station served as an Azteca affiliate as well as the current status of the corresponding channel that carried the network.

Final affiliates

Former affiliates

Notes

References

Affiliates
Azteca America